Brachyta danilevskyii is the species of the Lepturinae subfamily in long-horned beetle family. This beetle is distributed in Japan.

References

Lepturinae
Beetles described in 2005